Micrurus tener, commonly known as the Texas coral snake, is a species of venomous snake in the family Elapidae. The species is endemic to the southern United States and northeastern and central Mexico. Five subspecies are recognized as being valid, including the nominotypical subspecies, Micrurus tener tener, which is found in both the US and Mexico, and is also commonly known as the Texas coral snake. The species Micrurus tener was once considered to be a subspecies of the eastern coral snake (Micrurus fulvius).

Geographic range

M. tener ranges from the southern United States south to northeastern and central Mexico. It inhabits the states of Texas, Louisiana and Arkansas, and the Mexican states of Tamaulipas, San Luis Potosí, Guanajuato, Querétaro and Morelos.

Description
The Texas coral snake has the traditional coloration associated with coral snakes: black, yellow, and red rings. Males are typically smaller than females. It has smooth dorsal scales, a rounded head, and the eyes have round pupils. Albinistic (lacking black pigment) and anerythristic (lacking red pigment) specimens have been found in the wild. "Pastel" (pink, translucent cream, and very light blue) coloration has been noted, and completely black (melanistic) specimens, are known. The Texas coral snake is somewhat larger (longer and stouter) than the eastern coral snake (Micrurus fulvius), and has a somewhat larger venom yield.

Behavior
All coral snakes are shy, secretive animals, typically nocturnal. They spend most of their time hiding in leaf litter, under logs. They can be seen crawling on the surface, after heavy rains, when the nighttime temperatures rise above .

When grabbed suddenly, or sometimes just when touched, they may thrash about, swing around, and bite. Sometimes they are calm, and then suddenly swing around and bite, for no apparent reason.

Diet
The primary diet of M. tener consists of other snakes, primarily earth snakes, and other small fossorial species. It is cannibalistic. It also occasionally eats small lizards, but the consumption of rodents by coral snakes is rare.

Reproduction
M. tener is oviparous.

Mimicry
Other nonvenomous snakes resemble the Texas coral snake as a form of Batesian mimicry. In the United States only, all three species of venomous coral snakes (Micruroides euryxanthus, Micrurus fulvius, and Micrurus tener) can be identified by the red rings contacting the yellow rings. A common mnemonic device is "red and yellow, kill a fellow. Red on black, friend of Jack".

Venom

Texas coral snake venom is a powerful neurotoxin, causing neuromuscular dysfunction. Until 2006, no deaths from coral snake bites had been reported since the 1970s in the United States; however, rare, fatal bites have occurred, according to several scientific journals in the 1980s and 1990s.

Because of the low profits, the production of coral snake antivenin has been discontinued for several years. Prior to the availability of antivenin, the fatality rate of coral snake envenomations has been estimated at 10%, and death was primarily due to respiratory or cardiovascular failure as a result of paralysis induced by the neurotoxic venom.

Wyeth Pharmaceuticals, a wholly owned subsidiary of Pfizer, produced antivenin for the eastern coral snake, which can also be used for treatment of envenomation by the Texas coral snake. However, the last lot produced (Lot L67530) has an expiration date of January 31, 2020.  Pfizer indicates that antivenom is available and one source states that production has resumed.

A coral snake (genus Micrurus) is proteroglyphous, meaning it has a pair of deeply grooved, semihollow, chisel-shaped, fixed fangs in the front of its upper jaw, through which the venom is injected and encouraged via a chewing motion. Coral snakes do not necessarily need to bite and hold on for a brief time to deliver a significant amount of venom. They expel venom quickly during extraction into collection media in the lab. Severe envenomations have occurred after a quick bite. Many bites from coral snakes do not inject any venom at all (known as a dry bite).  A bite from any coral snake should be considered an extremely serious medical emergency, and medical treatment should be sought immediately, because symptoms of envenomation are known to sometimes delay manifestation for as long as 24 hours, but once present, often progress very rapidly.

Subspecies
The five recognized subspecies of M. tener are:
M. t. tener 
M. t.  fitzingeri 
M. t.  maculatus 
M. t. microgalbineus 
M. t.  tamaulipensis 

Nota bene: A trinomial authority in parentheses indicates that the subspecies was originally described in a genus other than Micrurus.

M. t.  tener is found in both the U.S. and Mexico, whereas the other four subspecies are endemic to Mexico.

Etymology
The subspecific name, fitzingeri, is in honor of Austrian herpetologist Leopold Fitzinger.

Taxonomy
The Texas coral snake was once considered a subspecies of the eastern coral snake, Micrurus fulvius, but more recent research has determined that it has enough morphological differences to be considered its own species.

References

Further reading
Baird SF, Girard C (1853). Catalogue of North American Reptiles in the Museum of the Smithsonian Institution. Part I.—Serpentes. Washington, District of Columbia: Smithsonian Institution. xvi + 172 pp. (Elaps tenere, new species, pp. 22–23).
Brown BC, Smith HM (1942). "A New Subspecies of Mexican Coral Snake". Proc. Biol. Soc. Washington 55: 63–65. (Micrurus fitzingeri microgalbineus, new subspecies).
Hubbs, Brian; O'Connor, Brendan (2012) A Guide to the Rattlesnakes and other Venomous Serpents of the United States. Tempe, Arizona: Tricolor Books. 129 pp. . (Micrurus tener tener, pp. 89–90).
Jan [G] (1858). "Plan d'une Iconographie descriptive des Ophidiens et Description sommaire de nouvelles espèces de Serpents ". Revue et Magasin de Zoologie Pure et Appliquée, Paris, Series 2, 10: 438–449, 514–527. (Elaps fitzingeri, new species, p. 521). (in French).
Roze JA (1967). "A Check List of the New World Venomous Coral Snakes (Elapidae), with Descriptions of New Forms". American Museum Novitates (2287): 1-60. (Micrurus fulvius maculatus, new subspecies, pp. 27–28, Figure 10).
Schmidt, Karl P.; Davis, D. Dwight (1941). Field Book of Snakes of the United States and Canada. New York: G.P. Putnam's Sons. 365 pp. (Micrurus fulvius tenere, pp. 274–276).

External links
eMedicine: Coral Snake Envenomations
Houston Herp: Texas Coral Snake

tener
Reptiles described in 1853
Snakes of North America
Reptiles of the United States
Fauna of the Southeastern United States
Reptiles of Mexico